Valenzuela micanopi is a species of lizard barklouse in the family Caeciliusidae. It is found in the Caribbean Sea and North America.

References

Caeciliusidae
Articles created by Qbugbot
Insects described in 1965